The Madonna Falls, is a waterfall believed to hold mana and have healing properties.

References

Waterfalls of Waikato
Waitomo District